Stephanie Emma Norlander (born 22 December 1995) is field hockey player from Canada. Norlander plays as a striker in the Canada national team. Norlander made her international debut as a teenager in 2012.

Playing career

Senior National Team
In 2013, Norlander was a member of the Canada squad at the 2013 Pan American Cup in Mendoza, Argentina, where the team won bronze. Norlander also scored her first international goal at the tournament, in a match against Guyana.

Norlander was a member of the bronze medal winning Canada team at the 2015 Pan American Games. This was Canada's first medal in the event since 1999. She was also a member of the team at the 2019 Pan American Games where they won a silver medal.

Junior National Team
Norlander has also represented Canada's junior national team, including at the 2013 Junior World Cup in Mönchengladbach, Germany, where the team finished in fourteenth place.

References

External links
 
 
 
 
 Stephanie Norlander at the Lima 2019 Pan American Games

1995 births
Living people
Canadian female field hockey players
KHC Leuven players
Commonwealth Games competitors for Canada
Field hockey players at the 2018 Commonwealth Games
Pan American Games medalists in field hockey
Pan American Games silver medalists for Canada
Pan American Games bronze medalists for Canada
Field hockey players at the 2015 Pan American Games
Field hockey players at the 2019 Pan American Games
Medalists at the 2015 Pan American Games
Medalists at the 2019 Pan American Games